This depiction of a standing warrior belongs to a Lower Niger Bronze Industry. He stands, wearing an asymmetrical skirt, a leopard's-tooth necklace and a Bell necklace, which would have intimidated enemies and protected the wearer in combat. His left hand wraps around a (now broken) sword, his right carries a rectilinear shield; holes in the center and heel of his feet indicate he may have originally been connected to a larger structure; the top of his face bears marks of Scarification, and he additionally wears a bead cap and necklace.

Cultural Origins 
Though his garb is clearly similar to that worn by Benin warriors depicted in the famous Benin Bronzes, the style of this piece (such as the "vigorous" gestures and upward-sweeping loincloth) are uncommon in Benin art. This, combined with the "rustic" style suggest it belongs to a separate artistic tradition, which is currently grouped with the "basket" Lower Niger Bronze Industries, perhaps also indicating the widespread nature of such cultural traits; it is tentatively suggested to belong to a hybrid Yoruba-Benin culture. The piece is cast bronze.

Lower Niger Bronze Industries 

The Lower Niger Bronze Industries encompass the works produced by multiple distinct cultural traditions, bound primarily by geographic location in the Lower Niger.

References 

History of Niger
Bronze Age